He Guangyuan (born February 1930) is a Chinese politician who served as  from 1989 to 1993 and  from 1993 to 1996.

He was an alternate member of the 12th and 13th Central Committee of the Chinese Communist Party, and a member of the 14th Central Committee of the Chinese Communist Party. He was a member of the Standing Committee of the 8th and 9th Chinese People's Political Consultative Conference.

Biography
He was born in Anxin County, Hebei, in February 1930. He joined the Chinese Communist Party (CCP) in July 1945. He worked in the Central Hebei Military District during the Chinese Civil War.

Starting in 1956, he served in several posts in Changchun First Automobile Manufacturing Factory, including technologist, deputy section chief, section chief, deputy factory director of Forging Branch, and factory director of Forging Branch. In 1966, the Cultural Revolution broke out, he was removed from office and effectively sidelined. He forced to work in the fields instead of working in the state-owned factory. He was later reinstated in 1972. In 1977, he was appointed party secretary and factory director of Changchun Tractor Factory, in addition to serving as vice mayor of Changchun.

He became  in 1980. In 1982, he became , rising to minister in 1993.

In March 1998, he took office as chairperson of the Handling Proposals Committee of the Chinese People's Political Consultative Conference, a post he kept until March 2003.

References

1930 births
Living people
People from Anxin County
Kyiv Polytechnic Institute alumni
People's Republic of China politicians from Hebei
Chinese Communist Party politicians from Hebei
Alternate members of the 12th Central Committee of the Chinese Communist Party
Alternate members of the 13th Central Committee of the Chinese Communist Party
Members of the 14th Central Committee of the Chinese Communist Party
Members of the Standing Committee of the 8th Chinese People's Political Consultative Conference
Members of the Standing Committee of the 9th Chinese People's Political Consultative Conference